The 2019 Chicago Fire season was the club's 24th year of existence, as well as their 22nd in Major League Soccer.

Current squad 
As of August 13, 2019. Sources: Chicago Fire official roster and Official MLS Roster

Player movement

In

Out 

The following players were drafted and did not sign a contract:
  Ebenezer Ackon (D), selected 53rd overall in the 2019 MLS SuperDraft from Bowling Green State University; signed with San Antonio FC
  Mark Forrest (F), selected 77th overall in the 2019 MLS SuperDraft from Lehigh University
  Grant Stoneman (D), selected 55th overall in the 2019 MLS SuperDraft from Loyola University Chicago; signed with Lansing Ignite
  Marco Ureña (F), selected in the Waiver Draft from Los Angeles FC; signed with Liga Deportiva Alajuelense

The following players were trialing or training with the club but did not sign a contract:
 Antonio Rodriguez
  Christopher Schorch, last played for  KFC Uerdingen 05

Loans Out

Technical staff

Standings

Eastern Conference table

Overall table

Match results

Preseason 
Kickoff times are in CST (UTC-06)

Major League Soccer 
Kickoff times are in CST (UTC-06)

Open Cup 

As a member of MLS, the Fire will enter the competition at the fourth round, scheduled to be played on June 12, 2019.

Kickoff times are in CST (UTC-06)

Leagues Cup 

The Fire were invited to this inaugural edition of this competition between MLS and Liga MX.

Kickoff times are in CST (UTC-06)

Squad statistics

Games Played

Goalkeeping Statistics

Goalscoring and Assisting Record

Cards

Note: Italics indicates a player who left during the season

Player Awards

Fire Awards
Man of the Match Awards

MLS Player of the Week

MLS Team of the Week

Affiliate Loans 
Nelson Rodriguez announced on January 8, 2019, that the Fire's affiliation with Tulsa had ended, and that they'd affiliate with Indy Eleven in the USL Championship and Lansing Ignite in USL League One for the year. The following players were loaned to either team above:

National team call-ups 
Yura Movsisyan
UEFA Nations League Match vs Gibraltar, November 16, 2018 (Started, played 70 minutes, scored four goals)
UEFA Nations League Match vs Liechtenstein, November 19, 2018 (Started, played 90 minutes)

Raheem Edwards
2019 CONCACAF Gold Cup Preliminary Roster

Francisco Calvo
Friendly vs Peru, June 5, 2019 (Did not play)
2019 CONCACAF Gold Cup Match vs Nicaragua, June 16, 2019 (Did not play)
2019 CONCACAF Gold Cup Match vs Bermuda, June 20, 2019 (Did not play)
2019 CONCACAF Gold Cup Match vs Haiti, June 24, 2019 (Started, played 90 minutes)
2019 CONCACAF Gold Cup Match vs Mexico, June 29, 2019 (Subbed on, played 21 minutes)
Friendly vs Uruguay, September 6 (Did not play)

Nicolas Hasler
UEFA Nations League Match vs Macedonia, November 16, 2018 (Started, played 90 minutes)
UEFA Nations League Match vs Armenia, November 19, 2018 (Started, played 90 minutes, scored one goal)
Euro 2020 Qualifying Match vs Greece, March 23, 2019 (Started, played 86 minutes)
Euro 2020 Qualifying Match vs Italy, March 26, 2019 (Started, played 90 minutes)

 Panama national under-23 football teamCristian Martínez

Przemysław Frankowski
Euro 2020 Qualifying Match vs Austria, March 21 (Subbed on, played 45 minutes)
Euro 2020 Qualifying Match vs Latvia, March 24 (Subbed on, played 7 minutes)
Euro 2020 Qualifying Match vs North Macedonia, June 7 (Started, played 46 minutes))
Euro 2020 Qualifying Match vs Israel, June 10 (Did not play)

Aleksandar Katai
Euro 2020 Qualifying Match vs Ukraine, June 7 (Did not play)
Euro 2020 Qualifying Match vs Lithuania, June 10 (Subbed on, played 3 minutes, 1 assist)
Euro 2020 Qualifying Match vs Portugal, September 7 (Subbed on, played 7 minutes)
Euro 2020 Qualifying Match vs Luxembourg, September 10 (Started, played 46 minutes)

 United StatesSenior TeamDjordje Mihailovic
Friendly vs Panama, January 27, 2019 (Started, played 62 minutes, scored one goal)
Friendly vs Costa Rica, February 2, 2019 (Started, played 63 minutes)
Friendly vs Jamaica, June 5, 2019 (Started, played 90 minutes)
2019 CONCACAF Gold Cup Match vs Guyana, June 18, 2019 (Subbed on, played 16 minutes)
2019 CONCACAF Gold Cup Match vs Trinidad and Tobago, June 22, 2019 (Did not play)
2019 CONCACAF Gold Cup Match vs Panama, June 26, 2019 (Started, played 90 minutes)
2019 CONCACAF Gold Cup Match vs Curaçao, June 30, 2019 (Did not play)
2019 CONCACAF Gold Cup Match vs Jamaica, July 3, 2019 (Did not play)
2019 CONCACAF Gold Cup Final vs Mexico, July 7, 2019 (Did not play)

U-23 TeamDjordje Mihailovic
Friendly vs Egypt, March 22, 2019 (Started, played 45 minutes)
Friendly vs Netherlands, March 24, 2019 (Started, played 90 minutes)
Friendly vs Japan, September 9 (Started, played 90 minutes)

U-15 TeamGabriel Slonina
Torneo delle Nazioni group stage match vs India, April 28, 2019 (Started, played 90 minutes, clean sheet)
Torneo delle Nazioni group stage match vs Slovenia, April 29, 2019 (Did not play)
Torneo delle Nazioni group stage match vs Mexico, April 30, 2019 (Started, played 90 minutes)
Torneo delle Nazioni 9th-12th consolation match qualifier vs England, May 2, 2019 (Did not play)
Torneo delle Nazioni 9th consolation match vs Norway, May 4, 2019

Note: Italics indicates player left after his first call up

References

External links 
 

Chicago Fire FC seasons
Chicago Fire Soccer Club
Chicago Fire Soccer Club
Chicago Fire